Keezh Vaanam Sivakkum is a 1981 Indian Tamil-language film, directed by Muktha Srinivasan and produced by S. Ravi. The film stars Sivaji Ganesan, Saritha, Jaishankar, Sarath Babu and Menaka. It is based on the play of the same name by Kuriakose Ranga. The film was released on 26 January 1981 and become a box-office hit, running for over 100 days in theaters. It was remade in Telugu as Gopala Krishnudu and in Malayalam as Chakravalam Chuvannappol.

Plot 

Dr. Dwarakanath is a renowned ophthalmologist in Coimbatore, devoted to God and with a high moral standing. He shares his happy home with his son Srivathsan, daughter-in-law Manju, a couple of relatives and a faithful servant. Dwarakanath's peaceful life is shattered by a double whammy, first when he discovers that Manju is afflicted with a dreadful disease and has only a few months to live and then a blind man Kumaran who is seeking revenge against an unknown perpetrator responsible for his sister's suicide, shows up at his doors and Dwarakanath realises the culprit is none other than his son Srivathsan. Dwarakanath tries to keep his son's culpability under wraps for Manju's sake considering her impending demise but Manju who is ignorant of her own ailment, misconstrues Dwarakanath's intentions and tries to unmask the culprit's identity and it soon turns out to be an intricate cat and mouse game between them both.

Cast 
Sivaji Ganesan as Dr. Dwarakanath
Saritha as Manju
Jaishankar as Senthil / Kumaran
Sarath Babu as Srivathsan
Menaka
Y. G. Mahendran
Vennira Aadai Moorthy
Kathadi Ramamurthy
Manorama as the maid
Major Sundarrajan as Dr. Sankara
C. I. D Sakunthala

Production
Keezh Vaanam Sivakkum was an adaptation of the stage play of the same name by Kuriakose Ranga. Visu wrote the screenplay for the film adaptation. Both Visu and Ranga expressed interest to Muktha Srinivasan to adapt the play into a film and wanted Sivaji Ganesan to play the protagonist, he was eventually chosen. Srinivasan initially wanted Sangili Murugan to portray Jaishankar's character; since he was busy with other commitments, he could not act in the film. The makers also initially wanted to cast Prabhu for Sarath Babu's character which they later dropped.

Soundtrack 
The music was composed by M. S. Viswanathan, with lyrics by Kannadasan. The song "Kadavul Ninaithan" became hugely popular.

Release and reception 
Keezh Vaanam Sivakkum was released on 26 October 1981, Diwali day. Despite facing competition from other Diwali releases such as Andha 7 Naatkal and Tik Tik Tik, it became a box office success, running for over 100 days in theatres. S. Shivakumar of Mid-Day appreciated the acting performances of Ganesan and Saritha. Nalini Shastry of Kalki praised Saritha for dominating Ganesan with her performance, called Kannadasan's lyrics as meaningful and also praised humour for evoking laughter.

References

External links 
 

1980s Tamil-language films
1981 films
Films directed by Muktha Srinivasan
Films scored by M. S. Viswanathan
Films with screenplays by Visu
Indian films based on plays
Tamil films remade in other languages